Group A of the 2011 CONCACAF Gold Cup was one of three groups competing of nations at CONCACAF Gold Cup 2011. The group's first round of matches were played on June, with the final round played on June 12. All six group matches were played at venues in the United States, in Arlington, Charlotte and Chicago. The group consisted of five-time Gold Cup champions, Mexico, as well as Costa Rica, El Salvador and Cuba.

Mexico vs El Salvador: failed drug testers versus match fixers
On June 5, 2011, Mexico defeated El Salvador, 5–0, in the first fixture for both teams.

Three days later, on the eve of Mexico's second fixture against Cuba, the Mexican Football Federation removed five players from their squad due to substance abuse. These players included starting goalkeeper, Guillermo Ochoa, starting center back Francisco Rodríguez and the following reserves: Sinha, Christian Bermúdez and Édgar Dueñas. The drug they tested positive for was clenbuterol, which is used in animals to produce lean meat. The supposition for the players being injected with this substance was from eating chicken that had traceable amounts of clenbuterol in it. Reports begin breaking on June 6 and were official on June 9. The "B" samples of those five involving players have been negative.

Two years later, on September 20, 2013, the Salvadoran Football Federation banned 14 Salvadoran players for life due to their involvement with match fixing while playing with the El Salvador national team over the previous two years, including 8 players (Dennis Alas, Luis Anaya, captain Marvin González, Reynaldo Hernández, Miguel Montes, Dagoberto Portillo, Osael Romero, Ramón Sánchez and Miguel Montes), from El Salvador's 5–0 loss to Mexico on June 5 at the 2011 CONCACAF Gold Cup.

Standings

All Times are U.S. Eastern Daylight Time (UTC−4) (Local Times in parentheses)

Costa Rica vs Cuba

Mexico vs El Salvador

Costa Rica vs El Salvador

Cuba vs Mexico

El Salvador vs Cuba

Mexico vs Costa Rica

References

External links
 

A
Gold